The Buxtehude-Werke-Verzeichnis ("Buxtehude Works Catalogue", commonly abbreviated to BuxWV) is the catalogue and the numbering system used to identify musical works by the German-Danish Baroque composer Dieterich Buxtehude (c. 1637 – 9 May 1707). It was compiled by Georg Karstädt and published in 1974 as Thematisch-Systematisches Verzeichnis der Musikalischen Werke von Dietrich Buxtehude. The second edition, published in 1985, contains minor additions and corrections. The catalogue is organized thematically, not chronologically, and contains 275 individual pieces. The Anhang ("Appendix") adds 13 spurious and falsely attributed works.

The fourteen trio sonatas (BuxWV 252–265) were the only works published during Buxtehude's lifetime. Originally issued in two volumes, the first seven are now commonly referred to as Buxtehude's opus 1 and the next seven as opus 2.

Vocal music

Cantatas (1–112)
 BuxWV 1 — Accedite gentes, accurite populi
 BuxWV 2 — Afferte Domino gloriam honorem
 BuxWV 3 — All solch dein Güt wir preisen
 BuxWV 4 — Alles, was ihr tut mit Worten oder mit Werken
 BuxWV 5 — Also hat Gott die Welt geliebet
 BuxWV 6 — An filius non est Dei, fons gratiae salus rei
 BuxWV 7 — Aperite mihi portas justitiae
 BuxWV 8 — Att du, Jesu, will mig höra
 BuxWV 9 — Bedenke, Mensch, das Ende, bedenke deinen Tod
 BuxWV 10 — Befiehl dem Engel, daß er komm
 BuxWV 11 — Canite Jesu nostro citharae, cymbala, organa
 BuxWV 12 — Cantate Domino canticum novum
 BuxWV 13 — Das neugeborne Kindelein, das herzeliebe Jesulein
 BuxWV 14 — Dein edles Herz, der Liebe Thron
 BuxWV 15 — Der Herr ist mit mir, darum fürchte ich mich nicht
 BuxWV 16 — Dies ist der Tag (lost)
 BuxWV 17 — Dixit Dominus Domino meo
 BuxWV 18 — Domine, savum fac regem et exaudi nos
 BuxWV 19 — Drei schöne Dinge sind
 BuxWV 20 — Du Friedefürst, Herr Jesu Christ
 BuxWV 21 — Du Friedefürst, Herr Jesu Christ
 BuxWV 22 — Du Lebensfürst, Herr Jesu Christ
 BuxWV 23 — Ecce nunc benedicite Domino
 BuxWV 24 — Eins bitte ich vom Herrn
 BuxWV 25 — Entreißt euch, meine Sinnen
 BuxWV 26 — Erfreue dich, Erde! Du Himmel erschall!
 BuxWV 27 — Erhalt uns, Herr, bei deinem Wort after Luther's hymn
 BuxWV 28 — Fallax mundus ornat vultus
 BuxWV 29 — Frohlocket mit Händen
 BuxWV 30 — Fürchtet euch nicht, siehe ich verkündige euch große Freude
 BuxWV 31 — Fürwahr, er trug unsere Krankheit
 BuxWV 32 — Gen Himmel zu dem Vater mein
 BuxWV 33 — Gott fähret auf mit Jauchzen
 BuxWV 34 — Gott hilf mir, denn das Wasser geht mir bis an die Seele
 BuxWV 35 — Herr, auf dich traue ich
 BuxWV 36 — Herr, ich lasse dich nicht
 BuxWV 37 — Herr, nun läßt du deinen Diener in Frieden fahren
 BuxWV 38 — Herr, wenn ich nur dich hab
 BuxWV 39 — Herr, wenn ich nur dich habe
 BuxWV 40 — Herren var Gud - Der Herr erhöre dich
 BuxWV 41 — Herzlich lieb hab ich dich, o Herr on Schalling's hymn
 BuxWV 42 — Herzlich tut mich verlangen
 BuxWV 43 — Heut triumphieret Gottes Sohn on the hymn by with a tune by Bartholomäus Gesius
 BuxWV 44 — Ich bin die Auferstehung und das Leben
 BuxWV 45 — Ich bin eine Blume zu Saron
 BuxWV 46 — Ich habe Lust abzuscheiden
 BuxWV 47 — Ich habe Lust abzuscheiden
 BuxWV 48 — Ich halte es dafür, daß dieser Zeit Leiden der Herrlichkeit nicht wert sei
 BuxWV 49 — Ich sprach in meinem Herzen
 BuxWV 50 — Ich suchte des Nachts in meinem Bette
 BuxWV 51 — Ihr lieben Christen, freut euch nun
 BuxWV 52 — In dulci jubilo, nun singet und seid froh!
 BuxWV 53 — In te, Domine, speravi. Non confundat in aeternum
 BuxWV 54 — Ist es recht, daß man dem Kaiser Zinse gebe oder nicht?
 BuxWV 55 — Je höher du bist, je mehr dich demütige
 BuxWV 56 — Jesu dulcis memoria
 BuxWV 57 — Jesu dulcis memoria
 BuxWV 58 — Jesu komm mein Trost und Lachen
 BuxWV 59 — Jesu meine Freud und Lust
 BuxWV 60 — Jesu meine Freude, meines Herzens Weide on Franck's hymn
 BuxWV 61 — Jesu, meiner Freuden Meister
 BuxWV 62 — Jesu, meines Lebens Leben
 BuxWV 63 — Jesulein, du Tausendschön, Blümlein aus dem Himmelsgarten
 BuxWV 64 — Jubilate Domino, omnis terra
 BuxWV 65 — Klinget mit Freuden, ihr klaron Klarinen
 BuxWV 66 — Kommst du, Licht der Heiden
 BuxWV 67 — Lauda anima mea Dominum
 BuxWV 68 — Lauda Sion Salvatorem
 BuxWV 69 — Laudate pueri, Dominum, laudate nomen Domini
 BuxWV 70 — Liebster, meine Seele saget mit durchaus verliebtem Sinn
 BuxWV 71 — Lobe den Herrn, meine Seele
 BuxWV 72 — Mein Gemüt erfreuet sich
 BuxWV 73 — Mein Herz ist bereit, Gott, daß ich singe und lobe
 BuxWV 74 — Meine Seele, willtu ruhn
 BuxWV 75 — Membra Jesu Nostri (a collection of seven cantatas)
 BuxWV 75a — Ad pedes: Ecce super montes
 BuxWV 75b — Ad genua: Ad ubera portabimini
 BuxWV 75c — Ad manus: Quid sunt plagae istae
 BuxWV 75d — Ad latus: Surge amica mea
 BuxWV 75e — Ad pectus: Sicut modo geniti infantes
 BuxWV 75f — Ad cor: Vulnerasti cor meum
 BuxWV 75g — Ad faciem: Illustra faciem tuam
 BuxWV 76 — Fried- und Freudenreiche Hinfarth (a collection of two cantatas)
 BuxWV 76a — Mit Fried und Freud (on Luther's hymn)
 BuxWV 76b — Klag-Lied: Muß der Tod denn auch entbinden
 BuxWV 77 — Nichts soll uns scheiden von der Liebe Gottes
 BuxWV 78 — Nimm von uns, Herr, du treuer Gott
 BuxWV 79 — Nun danket alle Gott
 BuxWV 80 — Nun freut euch, ihr Frommen, mit nir
 BuxWV 81 — Nun laßt uns Gott dem Herren Dank sagen
 BuxWV 82 — O clemens, o mitis, o coelestis Pater
 BuxWV 83 — O dulcis Jesu, o amor cordis mei
 BuxWV 84 — O fröhliche Stunden, o fröhliche Zeit
 BuxWV 85 — O fröhliche Stunden, o herrliche Zeit
 BuxWV 86 — O Gott, wir danken deiner Güt'''
 BuxWV 87 — O Gottes Stadt, o güldnes Licht BuxWV 88 — O Jesu mi dulcissime BuxWV 89 — O lux beata Trinitas et principalis unitas BuxWV 90 — O wie selig sind, die zu dem Abendmahl des Lammes berufen sind BuxWV 91 — Pange lingua gloriosi, corporis mysterium BuxWV 92 — Quemadmodum desiderat cervus BuxWV 93 — Salve desiderium, salve clamor gentium BuxWV 94 — Salve, Jesu, Patris gnate unigenite BuxWV 95 — Schaffe in mir, Gott, ein rein Herz BuxWV 96 — Schwinget euch himmelan, Herzen und Sinnen (Lübeck-Kantate)
 BuxWV 97 — Sicut Moses exaltavit serpentem BuxWV 98 — Singet dem Herren ein neues Lied BuxWV 99 — Surrexit Christus hodie BuxWV 100 — Wachet auf, ruft uns die Stimme BuxWV 101 — Wachet auf, ruft uns die Stimme BuxWV 102 — Wär Gott nicht mit uns diese Zeit on Luther's hymn
 BuxWV 103 — Walts Gott, mein Werk ich lasse BuxWV 104 — Was frag ich nach der Welt und allen ihren Schätzen BuxWV 105 — Was mich auf dieser Welt betrübt BuxWV 106 — Welt packe dich, ich sehne mich nur nach dem Himmel BuxWV 107 — Wenn ich, Herr Jesu, habe dich BuxWV 108 — Wie schmekt es so lieblich und wohl BuxWV 109 — Wie soll ich dich empfangen on Paul Gerhardt's hymn
 BuxWV 110 — Wie wird erneuet, wie wird erfreuet BuxWV 111 — Wo ist doch mein Freund geblieben? BuxWV 112 — Wo soll ich fliehen hin?Miscellaneous vocal music (113–135)

Liturgical works (113–114)
 BuxWV 113 — Motet 'Benedicam Dominum in omni tempore'
 BuxWV 114 — Missa brevis

Wedding arias (115–122)
 BuxWV 115 — Aria 'Auf, Saiten, auf! Lasst euren Schall erklingen!'
 BuxWV 116 — Aria 'Auf, stimmet die Saiten, Gott Phoebus tritt ein'
 BuxWV 117 — Aria 'Deh credete il vostro vanto'
 BuxWV 118 — Aria 'Gestreuet mit Bleumen'
 BuxWV 119 — Aria 'Klinget fur Freuden, ihr larmen Klarinen'
 BuxWV 120 — Aria 'O fröhliche Stunden, o herrlicher Tag'
 BuxWV 121 — Aria 'Opachi boschetti' (fragment of a lost wedding serenade)
 BuxWV 122 — Aria 'Schlagt, Künstler, die Pauken und Saiten'

Canons (123–124)
 BuxWV 123 — Canon duplex per Augmentationem
 BuxWV 124 — Canon à 3 in Epidiapente et Epidiapason

Titles of works not preserved (125–127)
 BuxWV 125 — Motet 'Christum lieb haben ist viel besser' (lost)
 BuxWV 126 — Musik zur Einweihung des Fredenhagen-Altars (lost)
 BuxWV 127 — Motet 'Pallidi salvete' (lost)

Abendmusiken (128–135)
 BuxWV 128 — Die Hochzeit des Lammes / Und die Freudenvolle Einholung der Braut zu derselben (lost)
 BuxWV 129 — Das allerschröcklichste und Allererfreulichste, nemlich Ende der Zeit und Anfang der Ewigkeit (lost)
 BuxWV 130 — Himmlische Seelenlust auf Erden (lost)
 BuxWV 131 — Der verlorene Sohn (lost)
 BuxWV 132 — Hundertjähriges Gedicht (lost)
 BuxWV 133 — Die Abendmusiken des Jahres 1700
 BuxWV 134 — Castrum Doloris (lost)
 BuxWV 135 — Templum Honoris (lost)

Organ (or other keyboard) works (136–225)

Freely composed (136–176)Note: Buxtehude preludes are multi-sectional and do not fit Bach-related terms such as "prelude and fugue" (despite this use by record companies); to make the distinction the German work "Praeludium" is conventional. Typical Buxtehude preludes begin free-style, switch to fugue, and then alternate between these forms, for a total of five to seven sections, two or three of which are fugues. The free-style sections are usually toccata-like. BuxWV 136 — Praeludium (with 3 Fugues) in C
 BuxWV 137 — Praeludium (with Fugue and Chaconne) in C
 BuxWV 138 — Praeludium in C
 BuxWV 139 — Praeludium (with 3 Fugues) in D
 BuxWV 140 — Praeludium (with 2 Fugues) in D minor
 BuxWV 141 — Praeludium in E
 BuxWV 142 — Praeludium (with 3 Fugues) in E minor
 BuxWV 143 — Praeludium (with 2 Fugues) in E minor
 BuxWV 144 — Praeludium in F — binary form with one fugue, so akin to a Bachian "prelude and fugue"
 BuxWV 145 — Praeludium in F — binary form with one fugue, so akin to a Bachian "prelude and fugue"
 BuxWV 146 — Praeludium (with 2 Fugues) in F-sharp minor
 BuxWV 147 — Praeludium in G
 BuxWV 148 — Praeludium in G minor
 BuxWV 149 — Praeludium (with 2 Fugues) in G minor
 BuxWV 150 — Praeludium (with 4 Fugues) in G minor
 BuxWV 151 — Praeludium in A
 BuxWV 152 — Praeludium in A minor (Phrygian mode)
 BuxWV 153 — Praeludium (with 2 Fugues) in A minor
 BuxWV 154 — Praeludium in B-flat
Toccatas
 BuxWV 155 — Toccata (with Fugal Sections) in D minor
 BuxWV 156 — Toccata (with Fugal Sections) in F
 BuxWV 157 — Toccata and Fugue in F

Ostinato works
 BuxWV 159 — Chaconne in C minor
 BuxWV 160 — Chaconne in E minor
 BuxWV 161 — Passacaglia in D minor — slower than the chaconnes

Other pedaliter work
 BuxWV 158 — Praeambulum in A minor — this is an early work, c. 1660

Manualiter works (i.e. no pedal)
 BuxWV 162 — Praeludium in G for Harpsichord (or Organ)
 BuxWV 163 — Praeludium (Toccatas and 3 Fugues) in G minor for Harpsichord (or Organ)
 BuxWV 164 — Toccata (with Fugue) in G for Harpsichord (or Organ)
 BuxWV 165 — Toccata (with Fugue) in G for Harpsichord (or Organ)
 BuxWV 166 — Canzona (with Fugues) in C for Harpsichord (or Organ)
 BuxWV 167 — Canzonetta in C for Harpsichord (or Organ)
 BuxWV 168 — Canzonetta in D minor for Harpsichord (or Organ)
 BuxWV 169 — Canzonetta in E minor for Harpsichord (or Organ)
 BuxWV 170 — Canzona (with Fugues) in G for Harpsichord (or Organ)
 BuxWV 171 — Canzonetta in G for Harpsichord (or Organ)
 BuxWV 172 — Canzonetta in G for Harpsichord (or Organ)
 BuxWV 173 — Canzonetta in G minor for Harpsichord (or Organ)
 BuxWV 174 — Fugue (Gigue) in C for Harpsichord
 BuxWV 175 — Fugue in G for Harpsichord
 BuxWV 176 — Fugue in B-flat for Harpsichord

Chorale preludes (177–224, including Magnificats and the Te Deum)Buxtehude composed chorale preludes on the following hymns: BuxWV 177 — Ach Gott und Herr (D minor )
 BuxWV 178 — Ach Herr, mich armen Sünder (A minor [Phrygian mode])
 BuxWV 179 — Auf meinen lieben Gott (E minor; a suite or Suite de danses for keyboard or organ)
 BuxWV 180 —  (D minor [Dorian mode])
 BuxWV 181 — Danket dem Herren, denn er ist sehr freundlich (G minor [Dorian mode])
 BuxWV 182 — Der Tag, der ist so freudenreich (G major)
 BuxWV 183 — Durch Adams Fall ist ganz verderbt (D minor [Dorian mode])
 BuxWV 184 — Ein feste Burg ist unser Gott (C major)
 BuxWV 185 —  (G minor [Dorian mode])
 BuxWV 186 — Es ist das Heil uns kommen her (C major)
 BuxWV 187 — Es spricht der Unweisen Mund wohl (G major)
 BuxWV 188 — Gelobet seist du, Jesu Christ (G major ; chorale fantasia)
 BuxWV 189 — Gelobet seist du, Jesu Christ (G major [Mixolydian mode])
 BuxWV 190 — Gott der Vater wohn uns bei (G major [Mixolydian mode])
 BuxWV 191 — Herr Christ, der einig Gotts Sohn (G major)
 BuxWV 192 — Herr Christ, der einig Gotts Sohn (G major)
 BuxWV 193 — Herr Jesu Christ, ich weiß gar wohl (A minor)
 BuxWV 194 — Ich dank dir, lieber Herre (F major; chorale fantasia)
 BuxWV 195 — Ich dank dir schon durch deinen Sohn (F major; chorale fantasia)
 BuxWV 196 — Ich ruf zu dir, Herr Jesu Christ (D minor [Dorian mode]; chorale fantasia)
 BuxWV 197 — In dulci jubilo (G major)
 BuxWV 198 — Jesus Christus, unser Heiland, der den Tod überwand (G minor [Dorian mode])
 BuxWV 199 — Komm, Heiliger Geist, Herre Gott (F major)
 BuxWV 200 — Komm, heiliger Geist, Herre Gott (F major)
 BuxWV 201 — Kommt her zu mir, spricht Gottes Sohn (G minor [Dorian mode])
 BuxWV 202 — Lobt Gott, ihr Christen, allzugleich (G major)
 BuxWV 203 — Magnificat primi toni in D minor Dorian mode (fantasia)
 BuxWV 204 — Magnificat primi toni in D minor (fantasia)
 BuxWV 205 — Magnificat noni toni in D minor Dorian mode (fantasia)
 BuxWV 206 — Mensch, willt du leben seliglich  (E minor [Phrygian mode])
 BuxWV 207 — Nimm von uns, Herr, du treuer Gott (D minor [Dorian mode]; chorale fantasia)
 BuxWV 208 — Nun bitten wir den heiligen Geist (G major)
 BuxWV 209 — Nun bitten wir den heiligen Geist (G major)
 BuxWV 210 —  (G major; chorale fantasia)
 BuxWV 211 — Nun komm, der Heiden Heiland (G minor [Dorian mode])
 BuxWV 212 — Nun lob, mein Seel, den Herren (C major; chorale fantasia)
 BuxWV 213 — Nun lob, mein Seel, den Herren
 BuxWV 214 — Nun lob, mein Seel, den Herren
 BuxWV 215 — Nun lob, mein Seel, den Herren
 BuxWV 216 — O Lux beata, Trinitas (fragment)
 BuxWV 217 — Puer natus in Bethlehem
 BuxWV 218 — Te Deum laudamus (fantasia in 5 sections: a prelude and 4 verse-settings; Buxtehude's longest organ work at 13–14 minutes)
 BuxWV 219 — Vater unser im Himmelreich
 BuxWV 220 — Von Gott will ich nicht lassen
 BuxWV 221 — Von Gott will ich nicht lassen
 BuxWV 222 — War Gott nicht mit uns diese Zeit
 BuxWV 223 — Wie schön leuchtet der Morgenstern (chorale fantasia)
 BuxWV 224 — Wir danken dir, Herr Jesu Christ

Canzonetta for keyboard or organ (225)
The keyboard canzonetta in A minor, BuxWV 225, was found just before the publication and therefore could not be inserted in the catalogue properly. This is why it does not appear with other canzonas and canzonettas and is in the end of the list of organ works.
 BuxWV 225 — Canzonetta in A minor for keyboard (or organ)

Works for harpsichord (226–251)

Suites for harpsichord (226–244)
 BuxWV 226 — Suite in C major
 BuxWV 227 — Suite in C major
 BuxWV 228 — Suite in C major
 BuxWV 229 — Suite in C major
 BuxWV 230 — Suite in C major
 BuxWV 231 — Suite in C major
 BuxWV 232 — Suite in D major
 BuxWV 233 — Suite in D minor
 BuxWV 234 — Suite in D minor
 BuxWV 235 — Suite in E minor
 BuxWV 236 — Suite in E minor
 BuxWV 237 — Suite in E minor
 BuxWV 238 — Suite in F major
 BuxWV 239 — Suite in F major
 BuxWV 240 — Suite in G major
 BuxWV 241 — Suite in G minor
 BuxWV 242 — Suite in G minor
 BuxWV 243 — Suite in A major
 BuxWV 244 — Suite in A minor

Variations and miscellaneous works for harpsichord (245–251)
 BuxWV 245 — Courante zimble with 8 variations in A minor
 BuxWV 246 — Aria with 10 variations in C major
 BuxWV 247 — Aria 'More Palatino' (Theme and 12 Variations) in C major
 BuxWV 248 — Aria 'Rofilis' (Theme and 3 Variations) in D minor; theme of Arrêtez, belle Iris, différez un moment by Jean-Baptiste Lully
 BuxWV 249 — Aria with 3 variations in A minor
 BuxWV 250 — Aria 'La Capricciosa' (Theme and 32 Variations) in G major
 BuxWV 251 — Seven suites "Die Natur und Eigenschaft der Planeten" for keyboard (lost, mentioned by Johann Mattheson)

Chamber music (252–275)
 Seven Sonatas, Op. 1 (c. 1694):
 BuxWV 252 — Sonata in F major for violin, viola da gamba and basso continuo
 BuxWV 253 — Sonata in G major for violin, viola da gamba and basso continuo
 BuxWV 254 — Sonata in A minor for violin, viola da gamba and basso continuo
 BuxWV 255 — Sonata in B-flat major for violin, viola da gamba and basso continuo
 BuxWV 256 — Sonata in C major for violin, viola da gamba and basso continuo
 BuxWV 257 — Sonata in D minor for violin, viola da gamba and basso continuo
 BuxWV 258 — Sonata in E minor for violin, viola da gamba and basso continuo
 Seven Sonatas, Op. 2 (1696):
 BuxWV 259 — Sonata in B-flat major for violin, viola da gamba and basso continuo
 BuxWV 260 — Sonata in D major for violin, viola da gamba and basso continuo
 BuxWV 261 — Sonata in G minor for violin, viola da gamba and basso continuo
 BuxWV 262 — Sonata in C minor for violin, viola da gamba and basso continuo
 BuxWV 263 — Sonata in A major for violin, viola da gamba and basso continuo
 BuxWV 264 — Sonata in E major for violin, viola da gamba and basso continuo
 BuxWV 265 — Sonata in F major for violin, viola da gamba and basso continuo
 BuxWV 266 — Sonata in C major for 2 violins, viola da gamba and basso continuo
 BuxWV 267 — Sonata in D major for viola da gamba, violone and basso continuo
 BuxWV 268 — Sonata in D major for viola da gamba and basso continuo
 BuxWV 269 — Sonata in F major for 2 violins, viola da gamba and basso continuo
 BuxWV 270 — Sonata in F major for 2 violins and basso continuo (fragment)
 BuxWV 271 — Sonata in G major for 2 violins, viola da gamba and basso continuo
 BuxWV 272 — Sonata in A minor for violin, viola da gamba and basso continuo
 BuxWV 273 — Sonata in B-flat major for violin, viola da gamba and basso continuo
 BuxWV 274 — Sonata (lost)
 BuxWV 275 — Sonata (lost)

Appendix (Anh. 1–13)

Doubtful works (1–8)
 BuxWV Anh. 1 — Magnificat anima mea Domine
 BuxWV Anh. 2 — Man singet mit Freuden vom Sieg
 BuxWV Anh. 3 — Wacht! Euch zum Streit gefasset macht / Das jüngste Gericht (oratorio in 3 acts)
 BuxWV Anh. 4 — Natalia Sacra (lost)
 BuxWV Anh. 5 — Sonata in D minor
 BuxWV Anh. 6 — Courante in D minor for harpsichord
 BuxWV Anh. 7 — Courante in G major for harpsichord
 BuxWV Anh. 8 — Simphonia in G major

Falsely attributed works (9–13)
 BuxWV Anh. 9 — Cantata 'Erbarm dich mein, o Herre Gott' (by Ludwig Busbetzky)
 BuxWV Anh. 10 — Psalm setting 'Laudate Dominum omnes gentes' (by Ludwig Busbetzky)
 BuxWV Anh. 11 — Chorale prelude 'Erhalt uns Herr, bei deinem Wort' for keyboard (author unknown, also attributed to Georg Böhm and Johann Pachelbel)
 BuxWV Anh. 12 — Suite in D minor for harpsichord (by Nicolas Lebègue)
 BuxWV Anh. 13 — Suite in G minor for harpsichord (by Nicolas Lebègue)

Literature
 Georg Karstädt. Thematisch-systematisches Verzeichnis der musikalischen Werke von Dietrich Buxtehude: Buxtehude-Werke-Verzeichnis (BuxWV)''. Breitkopf & Härtel, Wiesbaden 1985 (2nd edition),

External links
 Catalogue de l'oeuvre de Dietrich Buxtehude Full catalogue with details on individual pieces' structure (French)
 Wolf’s Thematic Index of the Works of the Great Composers (English, French, German)

Buxtehude, Dieterich, compositions by
Buxtehude